Downliners Sect are an English R&B and blues-based rock band, formed in the 1960s beat boom era.  Stylistically, they were similar to blues-based bands such as The Yardbirds, The Pretty Things and the Rolling Stones, playing basic R&B on their first album The Sect.  Critic Richie Unterberger wrote: "The Sect didn't as much interpret the sound of Chess Records as attack it, with a finesse that made the Pretty Things seem positively suave in comparison."

History
In 1962, Mick O'Donnell, later known as Don Craine, started a band called the Downliners, who, despite touring France, were unsuccessful.  The name of the band came from the Jerry Lee Lewis B-side "Down The Line".  After several lineup changes, the band folded, but in 1963, O'Donnell and drummer Johnny Sutton formed a new band out of the remnants of the previous act.  Keith Evans, formerly a drummer, joined on bass guitar.  Shortly thereafter the band would be named the Downliners Sect.  At this time some of the members decided to change their names.  Mick O'Donnell took the new name, Don Craine, and Keith Evans became Keith Grant.

The band was iconic during its time in the early 1960s, partly owing to Don Craine's deerstalker cap which he wore to mock the aristocracy. The band has many fans who have achieved commercial success, including Van Morrison, Steve Marriott, and Rod Stewart, the latter two had even auditioned for a place in the band but were turned down because they both wanted to be frontmen, while Don Craine and Keith Grant did not wish to relinquish that role.

They subsequently modified their musical style, and after an EP of 'sick' songs (e.g. "I Want My Baby Back"), they experimented with both country The Country Sect) and rock (Rock Sect's In). They later collaborated with Billy Childish's Thee Headcoats, and released two albums under the name Thee Headcoats Sect. They performed regularly at the Studio 51 club in Great Newport Street near Leicester Square tube station in London on a Friday night and Sunday afternoon, from which came the first EP featuring the songs "Beautiful Delilah" and "Little Egypt". The EP started off with the sound of the bells of Big Ben. The lead guitarist was Terry Clemson (Gibson) who played his Gibson 335.  Studio 51 was also known as the Ken Colyer Club and the Rolling Stones made many performances at this club, but according to Rod Harrison, guitarist with Asgaerd and school friend of Terry Clemson, "you could say the Downliners Sect were almost residents."

A reformed line-up with three original members, Keith Grant, Don Craine and Terry Gibson, released a new album Showbiz in 1979. A subsequent reformation featuring Grant and Craine who were joined by guitarist Del Dwyer in 1989 released Savage Return in 1991, Dangerous Ground in 1998 and Chinese Whispers in 2007.

Don Craine (born Michael O'Donnell) died on 24 February 2022, at the age of 76.

Members
Current members
Keith Grant – vocals/bass
John O'Leary – vocals/harp
Mark Freeman – drums

Past members
Don Craine – vocals/guitar (born 29 March 1945, died 24 February 2022)
Del Dwyer – vocals/guitar (died 31 December 2021)
Al Brooks – drums (died 4 January 2010)
Barry Cooper – keyboards
Rod de'Ath – drums (died 4 August 2014)
Matt Fisher – keyboards
Kevin Flanagan – drums
Terry Clemson – lead guitar (died 19 September 2020)
Pip Harvey – harmonica (died 14 February 2014)
Paul Holm – drums
Mel Lewis – lead guitar
Nat Maynard – keyboard
Ray Sone – harmonica
John Sutton – drums
Bob Taylor – lead guitar
Paul Tiller – harmonica
Zach Wilson – guitar
Paul Martinez – vocals/bass
 Mike Chapman – vocals/guitar

Discography

Singles
Jun 1964 – "Baby What's Wrong" / "Be A Sect Maniac" (Columbia DB 7300)
Sep 1964 – "Little Egypt (Ying-Yang)" / "Sect Appeal" (Columbia DB 7347)
Nov 1964 – "Find Out What's Happening" / "Insecticide" (Columbia DB 7415)
??? 1965 – "Wreck of the Old '97" / "Leader of the Sect" (Columbia DB 7509)
Jun 1965 – "I Got Mine" / "Waiting in Heaven Somewhere" (Columbia DB 7597)
Oct 1965 – "Bad Storm Coming" / "Lonely And Blue" (Columbia DB 7712)
Jan 1966 – "All Night Worker" / "He Was A Square" (Columbia DB 7817)
Jun 1966 – "Glendora" / "I'll Find Out" (Columbia DB 7939)
Sep 1966 – "The Cost of Living" / "Everything I've Got To Give" (Columbia DB 8008)

7" EPs
"Nite in Gt. Newport Street": Beautiful Delilah/Shame Shame Shame/Green Onions/Nursery Rhymes (Contrast RBCSP 001, 1964)
 "Brite Lites": Bright Lights Big City/I need you baby(mona)/Do the Dog/Roll Over Beethoven (Contrast RBCSP 002, 1964) :Unreleased, finished sleeves exist. Tapes lost in 1964, released in March 2011.
"The Sect Sing Sick Songs" – I Want My Baby Back/Leader of the Sect/Midnight Hour/Now She's Dead (Columbia SEG 8438, 1965)

LPs
The Sect (1964)
The Country Sect (1965)
The Rock Sect's In (1966)
Showbiz (1979)
Savage Return (1991)
Dangerous Ground (1998)
Chinese Whispers (2007)

The Sect (December 18, 1964)

 Hurt By Love
 One Ugly Child
 Lonely And Blue
 Our Little Rendezvous
 Guitar Boogie
 Too Much Monkey Business
 Sect Appeal
 Baby What's on Your Mind?
 Cops And Robbers
 Easy Rider
 Bloodhound
 Bright Lights
 I Wanna Put A Tiger in Your Tank
 Be A Sect Maniac

Columbia 33SX 1658

The Country Sect (1965) 

 If I Could Just Go Back
 Rocks in My Bed
 Ballad of the Hounds
 Little Play Soldiers
 Hard Travellin'
 Wait for the Light To Shine
 I Got Mine
 Waiting in Heaven
 Above And Beyond
 Bad Storm Coming
 Midnight Special
 Wolverton Mountain

Columbia 33SX 1745

The Rock Sect's In (April 1966) 

 Hang on Sloopy
 Fortune Teller
 Hey Hey Hey Hey
 Everything I've Got To Give
 Outside
 I'm Hooked on You
 Don't Lie To Me
 Why Don't You Smile Now (Phillips, Vance, Reed, Cale)
 May The Bird of Paradise Fly Up Your Nose
 He Was A Square
 I'm Looking for a Woman
 Rock Sect's in Again
 Brand New Cadillac

Columbia 33SX 6028

The Definitive Downliners Sect: Singles – A's & B's (1994) 

 Cadillac
 Roll Over Beethoven
 Beautiful Delilah
 Shame, Shame, Shame
 Green Onions
 Nursery Rhymes
 Baby What's Wrong
 Be A Sect Maniac
 Little Egypt (Ying-Yang)
 Sect Appeal
 Find Out What's Happening
 Insecticide
 Wreck of the Old '97
 Leader of the Sect
 I Want My Baby Back
 Midnight Hour
 Now She's Dead
 I Got Mine
 Waiting in Heaven Somewhere
 Bad Storm Coming
 Lonely And Blue
 All Night Worker
 He Was A Square
 Glendora
 I'll Find Out
 Cost of Living
 Everything I've Got To Give
 I Can't Get Away From You
 Roses

See For Miles SEECD398

References

External links

 

Musical groups established in 1963
English rock music groups
Musical groups from London
Beat groups
Columbia Records artists
British rhythm and blues boom musicians
1963 establishments in England
British garage rock groups